Paraná was a  destroyer of the Brazilian Navy, serving from 1910 to 1933. She was named after Brazilian state of Paraná.

Description and construction

Steam for the turbines was provided by two double-ended Yarrow boilers.

The ship mounted two  guns in single mounts. In addition, four 47 mm (3pdr) cannons in single mounts were deployed at the time of launching.

References

Bibliography 
 "Paraná III." Serviço de Documentação da Marinha — Histórico de Navios. Diretoria do Patrimônio Histórico e Documentação da Marinha, Departamento de História Marítima. Accessed 27 August 2017.
 Gardiner, Robert and Randal Gray, eds. Conway's All the World's Fighting Ships 1906–1921. Annapolis: Naval Institute Press, 1985. . .
 "CT Paraná - CT 8." Navios De Guerra Brasileiros. Accessed 27 August 2017.

Pará-class destroyers (1908)
1910 ships
Ships built in Glasgow